Hot August Nights is an annual event held in Reno and Virginia City, Nevada during the days of August 2-7. The event is mostly around classic vehicles manufactured before the 1970s, and is based on Rock And Roll as well.

The term Hot August Nights got its name from the weather being hot as it generally is during the month of August.

History 
Neil Diamond’s epic album at the Greek Theatre on August 24, 1972 brought the term “Hot August Night” to international attention. Later events also using the term were first created by Willie Ray Davison on August 1, 1986 with the intent to celebrate Rock and Roll music, America's culture in the 1950s, to increase tourism during the month and to raise money for charities. The event was first held at the Reno-Sparks Convention Center during a live event with the Righteous Brothers, Wolfman Jack, and Jan & Dean.

The event branched off on its own and is now held in several locations, including Virginia City, Victorian Square in Sparks, Peppermill Hotel And Casino, Atlantis Casino Resort Spa, Grand Sierra Resort and Virginia Street in downtown Reno.

On July 5, 2010 it was reported by the Los Angeles Business Journal 1 that Hot August Nights would start an event in Long Beach, California, to be held the week before the popular Reno, Nevada event, the summer of 2011. Further, the article claimed that the event in Reno would cease to exist as of summer 2012, and the Long Beach event was to take its place. This caused significant uproar in the Reno community. Hot August Nights officials confirmed that they planned to host events in Long Beach, and that they planned to open offices in Long Beach as well. Officials, however, claimed at the time that there was no truth to the rumors that they wished to discontinue the popular Reno event. 2 

The plans for a larger Long Beach, California event never came to fruition. 

The event was cancelled in 2020 due to the COVID-19 pandemic.

References

External links

Los Angeles Business Journal Rock and classic cars will hit Long Beach streets as the city has lured away Hot August Nights from a Nevada city.
Tahoe Daily Tribune Hot August Nights refutes reports of move to Long Beach Tahoe Daily Tribune July 6, 2010

Annual events in Nevada
Culture of Reno, Nevada